A butterfly house is a facility for the display and breeding of butterflies.

Butterfly house may also refer to:

 Butterfly House (album), by the Coral, 2010
 Butterfly House, Missouri Botanical Garden, a butterfly zoo in Chesterfield, Missouri, US
 Butterfly House (Carmel-by-the-Sea, California), USA
 Janet V. Machiewitz Butterfly House, Churchville Nature Center, Bucks County, Pennsylvania, US
 McCraith House or Butterfly House, a national heritage-listed house in Victoria, Australia